The 1991 NHL Entry Draft was the 29th NHL Entry Draft. It was held on June 22 at the Memorial Auditorium in Buffalo, New York. A total of 264 players were drafted. The worst team in the previous 1990–91 season, the Quebec Nordiques, was given the first overall pick while the expansion San Jose Sharks held the second overall pick.

The draft was famous for the controversy surrounding star first overall draft pick, touted by some observers to be The Next One, Eric Lindros, who was drafted by the Quebec Nordiques but immediately refused to sign a contract. What followed was one of the biggest trades in NHL history, which the Philadelphia Flyers used to acquire Lindros, in the process trading away future superstar Peter Forsberg.

The last active player in the NHL from this draft class was Ray Whitney, who retired after the 2013–14 season, he also led the entire draft in Games played (1330), as well as Points (1064).

Selections by round
Club teams in North America unless otherwise noted.

Round one

Round two

Round three

Round four

Round five

Round six

Round seven

Round eight

Round nine

Round ten

Round eleven

Round twelve

Draftees based on nationality

See also
 1991 NHL Supplemental Draft
 1991 NHL Dispersal and Expansion Drafts
 1991–92 NHL season
 List of NHL players

References

External links
1991 NHL Entry Draft player stats at The Internet Hockey Database

Draft
National Hockey League Entry Draft